Night of Nights... Live!  is a live album by Australian band, The Seekers. The album was released in October 2002. The Night of Nights tour was from 18 February to 16 April 2000, and later in the UK from 29 May to 6 June 2000. The album was re-released in August 2019 under the title, The Carnival of Hits Tour 2000.

Track listing
CD1
 "You Can Tell The World"  - 2:15
 "Love is Kind, Love is Wine" - 2:26
 "When the Stars Begin to Fall" - 3:08
 "This Train" 			
 "Morningtown Ride" - 2:41 
 "When Will the Good Apples Fall" - 2:29	
 "Red Rubber Ball" - 2:13 
 "Puff the Magic Dragon" 
 "I Am Australian"
 "The Light from the Lighthouse"
 "Medley"  ("Open Up Them Pearly Gates"/"We Shall Not Be Moved") 

CD2
 "I'll Never Find Another You" (Tom Springfield) -  2:42
 "Someday One Day" - 2:35
 "Walk with Me"
 "The Shores of Avalon"
 "You're My Spirit"
 "Colours Of My Life" - 2:44
 "The Bush Girl" 		
 "Myra" - 2:00	
 "Just a Closer Walk with Thee" - 3:21
 "Ten Thousand Years Ago" 
 "This is My Song" - 2:47	
 "Keep a Dream in Your Pocket		
 "Georgy Girl" - 2:20
 "The Carnival is Over - 3:12
 "A World of Our Own" - 2:43

Charts

Release history

References

Live albums by Australian artists
Sony Music Australia albums
The Seekers albums
2002 live albums